Atiq or Ateeq (also transliterated as Ateeque,  Ateeque, Ateeq, Atteq, Atik, or  Ateek) is a male Arabic given name, the name appears in the Quran several times. It means "old" or "ancient," and the name is widely used in Muslim countries.

Given name
 Atik Sinan, 15th-century Ottoman Turkish architect. 
 Atik Ali Pasha (died 1511), Ottoman statesman of Bosnian origin. He served as governor of Rumeli, and led the Ottoman army in the Ottoman–Mamluk War of 1485–1491, but was defeated at Adana in 1488. He was then position of Grand Vizier from 1501 to 1503, and again from 1509 to 1511.
 Atiq Ullah (Kashmiri muslim leader) (1872–1962), Mirwaiz of Kashmir (religious and cultural leader of Kashmir).
 Atik Jauhari (born 1949), Indonesian badminton coach
 Attique Ahmed Khan (born 1955), Pakistani Kashmiri politician
 Atik Ismail (born 1957), Finnish footballer
 Atiq Rahimi (born 1962), French-Afghan writer and filmmaker
 Atique Ahmed (born 1962), Indian politician and criminal
 Atique Choudhury (born 1963), English restaurateur and chef
 Mohamed Atiq Awayd Al Harbi (born 1973), Saudi detainee at Guantanamo
 Atiq-uz-Zaman (born 1975), Pakistani cricketer
 Ateeq Hussain Khan (born 1980), Indian singer
 Atiq-ul-Rehman (born 1981), Pakistani-born English cricketer
 Atik Chihab (born 1982), Moroccan footballer
 Atiq Ullah (footballer) (born 1983), Pakistani footballer
 Atiq-ur-Rehman (born 1984), Pakistani cricketer
 Ateeq Javid (born 1991), English cricketer
 Muhammad Ateeq Shaikh, Pakistani politician

Surname
 Abdullah ibn Atik, companion of Muhammad
 Barış Atik (born 1995), Turkish footballer 
 Celal Atik (1920–1979), Turkish wrestler and coach
 Fahad al-Ateeq, Saudi writer
 Fatih Atik (born 1984), French footballer
 Ferhat Atik (born 1971), Turkish Cypriot filmmaker and novelist
 Hanna Atik (born 1959), Lebanese politician
 Moin-ul-Atiq (born 1964), Pakistani cricketer
 Muratt Atik, Turkish-French actor
 Naim Ateek (born 1937), Palestinian priest
 Orhan Atik (born 1967), Turkish football coach
 Rita Atik, Moroccan tennis player

See also
 Attik (1885–1944), Greek composer
 Atik (disambiguation)
 Atiqullah (disambiguation)

References

Arabic-language surnames
Arabic masculine given names
Pakistani masculine given names
Turkish masculine given names